Lake Rivadavia (Lago Rivadavia) is a lake in Chubut Province, Argentina.  Lake Rivadavia is the second lake, after Lake Cholila, in the chain of lakes in the Futaleufú River system of Argentina which via Yelcho Lake and the Yelcho River flows into the Pacific Ocean in Chile. Located in the Andes, Lake Rivadavia is of glacial origin and occupies a narrow north to south valley between glaciated peaks. All the lake except the northern tip is in the Los Alerces National Park. Argentina Provincial Highway 71 (RP 71) (unpaved in 2016) follows the eastern coast of the lake. Development consists only of a few campgrounds near the highway. 

Description
The Jara River joins the Lake Rivadavia on the west side near its southern end. The outflow from the lake is the Rivadavia River, which flows  to Green Lake (Lago Verde),  in size, a much smaller lake than Rivadavia. The Rivadavia River and Lago Verde are famous for trout fishing with "turquoise water, Jurassic Park like jungle, and snow-capped peaks." Rainbow, brown, and brook trout and landlocked Atlantic Salmon are found in the lake and river, all of them introduced rather than native.

The outlet from Green Lake is called the Arrayanes River. A pedestrian bridge crosses the river near the outlet. Argentina Provincial Highway 71 follows the shoreline of Green Lake and the Arrayanes River to Futalaufquen Lake. Campgrounds and lodges accommodate visitors.

References

Rivadavia
Rivadavia
Rivadavia